Stephen "Wally" Wallis (born 27 October 1964) is a former Australian rules footballer who represented the Footscray Football Club in the Victorian Football League (VFL). He currently holds the club record for most consecutive games from debut.

Originally from Leongatha, Victoria, Wallis arrived at the Footscray in 1982 and suffered an injury in a reserves game which kept him out for the rest of the season. He made his senior VFL debut in 1983 and became a solid defender and occasional midfielder.

In 1989, Wallis was appointed captain of the Bulldogs, and became a representative of Victoria in State of Origin. Midway through 1991 he suffered a broken wrist, forcing him to miss the rest of the season, but returned in 1992 to help the Bulldogs to the finals. However, injury struck again early in the following year when he badly injured his knee.

In 1996, he announced his retirement and played his last game in a three-point loss to Essendon (which is documented in the film Year of the Dogs).

His son Mitch Wallis was drafted in the 2010 national draft under the father-son rule.

Statistics

|- style="background-color: #EAEAEA"
! scope="row" style="text-align:center" | 1983
|style="text-align:center;"|
| 24 || 22 || 7 || 13 || 287 || 226 || 513 || 102 ||  || 0.3 || 0.6 || 13.0 || 10.3 || 23.3 || 4.6 || 
|- 
! scope="row" style="text-align:center" | 1984
|style="text-align:center;"|
| 24 || 22 || 7 || 12 || 292 || 160 || 452 || 76 ||  || 0.3 || 0.5 || 13.3 || 7.3 || 20.5 || 3.5 || 
|- style="background:#eaeaea;"
! scope="row" style="text-align:center" | 1985
|style="text-align:center;"|
| 24 || 25 || 6 || 10 || 464 || 158 || 622 || 178 ||  || 0.2 || 0.4 || 18.6 || 6.3 || 24.9 || 7.1 || 
|- 
! scope="row" style="text-align:center" | 1986
|style="text-align:center;"|
| 24 || 22 || 6 || 6 || 325 || 142 || 467 || 112 ||  || 0.3 || 0.3 || 14.8 || 6.5 || 21.2 || 5.1 || 
|- style="background:#eaeaea;"
! scope="row" style="text-align:center" | 1987
|style="text-align:center;"|
| 24 || 22 || 3 || 6 || 329 || 145 || 474 || 68 || 46 || 0.1 || 0.3 || 15.0 || 6.6 || 21.5 || 3.1 || 2.1
|- 
! scope="row" style="text-align:center" | 1988
|style="text-align:center;"|
| 24 || 13 || 7 || 1 || 156 || 121 || 277 || 36 || 19 || 0.5 || 0.1 || 12.0 || 9.3 || 21.3 || 2.8 || 1.5
|- style="background:#eaeaea;"
! scope="row" style="text-align:center" | 1989
|style="text-align:center;"|
| 24 || 22 || 3 || 1 || 247 || 181 || 428 || 80 || 33 || 0.1 || 0.0 || 11.2 || 8.2 || 19.5 || 3.6 || 1.5
|- 
! scope="row" style="text-align:center" | 1990
|style="text-align:center;"|Footscray
| 24 || 19 || 1 || 1 || 216 || 186 || 402 || 73 || 24 || 0.1 || 0.1 || 11.4 || 9.8 || 21.2 || 3.8 || 1.3
|- style="background:#eaeaea;"
! scope="row" style="text-align:center" | 1991
|style="text-align:center;"|
| 24 || 10 || 0 || 1 || 106 || 90 || 196 || 40 || 19 || 0.0 || 0.1 || 10.6 || 9.0 || 19.6 || 4.0 || 1.9
|- 
! scope="row" style="text-align:center" | 1992
|style="text-align:center;"|
| 24 || 24 || 12 || 1 || 343 || 185 || 528 || 112 || 43 || 0.5 || 0.0 || 14.3 || 7.7 || 22.0 || 4.7 || 1.8
|- style="background:#eaeaea;"
! scope="row" style="text-align:center" | 1993
|style="text-align:center;"|
| 24 || 4 || 0 || 0 || 50 || 30 || 80 || 22 || 7 || 0.0 || 0.0 || 12.5 || 7.5 || 20.0 || 5.5 || 1.8
|- 
! scope="row" style="text-align:center" | 1994
|style="text-align:center;"|
| 24 || 23 || 3 || 1 || 245 || 125 || 370 || 83 || 34 || 0.1 || 0.0 || 10.7 || 5.4 || 16.1 || 3.6 || 1.5
|- style="background:#eaeaea;"
! scope="row" style="text-align:center" | 1995
|style="text-align:center;"|
| 24 || 12 || 2 || 0 || 115 || 60 || 175 || 43 || 18 || 0.2 || 0.0 || 9.6 || 5.0 || 14.6 || 3.6 || 1.5
|- 
! scope="row" style="text-align:center" | 1996
|style="text-align:center;"|
| 24 || 21 || 0 || 1 || 224 || 117 || 341 || 76 || 22 || 0.0 || 0.0 || 10.7 || 5.6 || 16.2 || 3.6 || 1.0
|- class="sortbottom"
! colspan=3| Career
! 261
! 57
! 54
! 3399
! 1926
! 5325
! 1101
! 265
! 0.2
! 0.2
! 13.0
! 7.4
! 20.4
! 4.2
! 1.6
|}

References

External links

1964 births
Living people
Western Bulldogs players
Victorian State of Origin players
Leongatha Football Club players
Australian rules footballers from Victoria (Australia)
People from Leongatha